Diane Gromala (born 24 February 1960) is a Canada Research Chair and a Professor in the Simon Fraser University School of Interactive Arts and Technology. Her research works at the confluence of computer science, media art and design, and has focused on the cultural, visceral, and embodied implications of digital technologies, particularly in the realm of chronic pain.

Education 
Gromala received her bachelor's degree (BFA) in Design & Photography from the University of Michigan in 1982, her Master of Fine Arts (MFA) degree from Yale University in 1990, and her PhD in Human Computer Interaction from Plymouth University in 2007.

Career 

From 1982 to 1990, Gromala worked in industry as art director for MacWorld and Apple Computer. Gromala was one of the first artists to work with immersive virtual reality (VR), beginning with Dancing with the Virtual Dervish. Co-created with choreographer Yacov Sharir in 1990 at the Banff Centre for the Arts' Art & Virtual Environments residency, this piece has been exhibited worldwide from 1993-2004. Gromala subsequently designed immersive VR for stress-reduction, anxiety-reduction, and pain distraction during chemotherapy at Georgia Tech. Gromala's work has been used in over 20 hospitals and clinics.

Gromala is the founding director of the Chronic Pain Research Institute, an interdisciplinary team of artists, designers, computer scientists, neuroscientists, and medical doctors investigating how new technologies—ranging from virtual reality and visualization to social media—may be used as a technological form of analgesia and pain management. With Jay Bolter, Gromala is the co-author of Windows and Mirrors: Interaction Design, Digital Art and the Myth of Transparency. This book was based on her experience as the Art Gallery Chair for SIGGRAPH 2000, which had the greatest number of interactive artworks in its history. Her work is widely published in the domains of Computer Science, Interactive Art and Interaction Design. Her pioneering virtual reality work has been featured on the BBC, CNN, the Discovery Channel, and the New York Times.

Gromala was a faculty member at the University of Texas at Austin; the University of Washington, where she headed the New Media Research Lab; a member of the Human Interface Technology Lab (HITLab); at graduate programme for Information Design at Georgia Tech's School of Literature, Communication and Culture (LCC); and a member of the renowned GVU (Graphics, Visualization & Usability) Center. She is currently a professor at Simon Fraser University (SFU) in Vancouver, Canada.

Awards 
In 2017, Gromala has awarded the grand prize at Stanford University’s Brainstorm VR/AR Innovation Lab competition, along with colleagues Faranak Farzan and Sylvain Moreno.

Selected publications

References

Further reading

External links 
 Diane Gromala speaking at TEDxAmericanRiveriera Curative Powers of Wet, Raw Beauty 
 Confronting Pain Website
 Pain Studies Lab Website
 School of Interactive Arts and Technology - Diane Gromala profile

Academic staff of Simon Fraser University
21st-century Canadian women scientists
Living people
1960 births
Canadian women computer scientists
Canadian computer scientists
Penny W. Stamps School of Art & Design alumni